Chris Sheppard (also known as DJ Dogwhistle) is a Canadian former DJ and musician. One of the leading figures in the Canadian dance music scene in the 1980s and 1990s, he was active as a club and radio DJ and as a musician with the bands BKS and Love Inc.

Career
Sheppard's career began in the early 1980s as a DJ and host of several warehouse parties in the Toronto area. In 1985, David Marsden hired him as the host of a Saturday night alternative dance music show, Club 102, on CFNY. this later expanded to a live broadcast from various Toronto nightclubs on Friday nights, a type of broadcast which was later copied by many other radio stations.

Sheppard later moved to Energy 108 and later Z103.5 where he launched his program, Pirate Radio later renamed Groove Station, into syndication across Canada. Sheppard also launched the Juno Award-winning dance groups BKS (Quality Records) and Love Inc.(BMG Canada), with whom he had several charting pop and dance hits.

Sheppard launched his own record label, Pirate Records, to release compilation albums of dance music from around the world in Canada. His compilation album series included Pirate Radio Sessions, Destination Dance Floor, Groove Station and Club Cutz.

During the late '80s and early '90s when Toronto's rave scene was at its peak, Sheppard would often attend as a guest DJ under his rave alias "Dogwhistle". Sheppard released two CD compilations under the Dogwhistle alias, entitled 2 Hi 4 Humans and The Life and Times of an After Hours DJ. 

Sheppard retired from DJing in the late '90s and claims to have a Ph.D in Molecular Science from the University of Toronto, a Ph.D in Neuroscience from the Australian National University, and gave lectures on occasion at the University of Toronto.

Discography
Techno Trip (1992)
Sheppard's Revenge (1992)
Still Trippin (1992)
Trip to the Moon (1993)
Have a Nice Trip (1993)
Pirate Radio Sessions Vol. 1: The Underground Collection (1994)
Pirate Radio Sessions Vol. 2: Club Culture (1994)
The Life and Time of an After Hours DJ (1995, as Dogwhistle)
Pirate Radio Sessions Vol. 3 (1995)
Pirate Radio Sessions Vol 4: The Best of 1995 (1995)
Destination Dance Floor (1995)
Pirate Radio Sessions Vol. 5 (1996)
2 Hi 4 Humans (1996, as Dogwhistle)
Destination Dance Floor 2 (1996)
Pirate Radio Sessions Vol. 6 (1996)
Destination Dance Floor 3 (1997)
Kwikmix 2938 (1998, as Dogwhistle)
Groove Station 4 (1998)
Club Cutz 101 (1998)
Club Cutz 201 (1999)
Groove Station 5 (1999)
Club Cutz 303 (2000)
Groove Station 6 (2000)
Club Cutz 404 (2001)
Euphoria: Hard House & Progressive Anthems (2001)
Club Cutz 505 (2001)
Club Cutz 606 (2002)
Euphoria 2: Deep, Dark & Underground (2002)
Loud Ass Mother Fucker (2006)

References

Canadian DJs
Canadian radio personalities
Living people
Electronic dance music DJs
Year of birth missing (living people)